Senhora do Verde is a small village near Mexilhoeira Grande, Portugal.

Villages in Portugal